Kalyug is a 2005 Indian Hindi-language action thriller film written and directed by Mohit Suri and produced by Mukesh Bhatt. It introduces actor Kunal Khemu, in his debut film as an adult actor. It also stars Emraan Hashmi, Smilie Suri,
Deepal Shaw, Amrita Singh and Ashutosh Rana. The film follows a young man who sets out to exact revenge upon the porn industry after his wife commits suicide due to the footage of their first night getting released on internet.

Kalyug released on 9 December 2005. It featured the hardcore pornographic website  which inspired a real website of the same name.

Plot
18 years ago, the Dhar family, consisting of Pushkaran and his son, Kunal, were forced to leave Kashmir by terrorists. Pushkaran and Kunal re-locate to Bombay, where Kunal grows up. One day, the police knock on Kunal's door, informing him that his father had lost his hold from a crowded local train and was instantly killed after falling on the rails. A devastated Kunal arranges his father's funeral. Before he can reconcile to living alone, relatives contact him from Jammu, informing him that his father had promised to look after a young woman named Renuka. Kunal agrees to fulfill his father's promise.

When Renuka arrives, she finds out about the untimely death, and wants to return, but ticket reservation forces her to stay with Kunal for a week. It is this week that changes their lives, for they fall in love and get married.

They spend their first night together at a hotel, where they encounter Johnny, a womaniser who tells the manager to book them into the honeymoon suite. A few nights later, police storm into their house and arrest the two. During the interrogation, it is revealed that their intimate night at the hotel was secretly recorded and uploaded onto a porn website. Kunal realizes that Johnny was responsible for having them exploited.

Meanwhile, Renuka is forced by the police to sign papers and testify against Kunal. As she is led out, she encounters Kunal, who tells her the truth and begs her not to sign the papers. All these feelings of guilt, embarrassment, and confusion proves too much for Renuka, she then jumps off the ledge and commits suicide in front of Kunal. Kunal is sent to prison since he refuses to admit guilt to the false charge.

Kunal is later able to prove himself innocent and decides to track down Johnny and his team to get revenge. He discovers Johnny is working for a businesswoman Simi Roy, who secretly is the porn-website creator living in Zurich, Switzerland. Kunal leaves for Zurich in order to take revenge against Johnny and Simi Roy.

In Zurich, Kunal comes across Ali, a modern-day emo, who runs an adults only shop. In his shop, Kunal sees a magazine featuring Jazmin, a pornstar he had seen on the same website where his and Renuka's video was featured.

Kunal and Ali track the girl down in a bar where she is a prostitute, instead Kunal finds a young girl being held hostage and beats up the bodyguards, but gets hit by Simi Roy. The next day, Kunal overhears Simi fighting with her abusive daughter, Tanya, about being drunk and doing sexual activities with her girlfriend Jessica Simpson. Kunal then asks Simi about the blue film porn website, but Simi lies to him.

The girl Kunal helped is revealed to be Anny and tells Kunal that after her hometown got destroyed in the Gujarat earthquake, which killed her parents, her uncle sold her to Johnny and his friend Vick for money. She tried to escape but was quickly captured and forced to enter the porn industry and be sexually exploited.

Kunal and Ali lure Johnny and his bouncer goons into a trap during the fight, Ali is fatally stabbed by Johnny in the genitalia, but is still able to kill Johnny and his men. Before dying, Ali reveals that he knows Simi Roy is the main mastermind behind the pornography website and also controls the red light district in Zurich.

Kunal asks Tanya for help, and in return, he will help her ruin Simi's life and reputation. Simi, who see her own daughter on her porn website following a news report, feels devastated and is confronted by Kunal and Tanya, where Tanya kills her following a brief fight. Kunal is found not guilty of all charges and starts a new life with Jazmin.

Cast
 Kunal Khemu as Kunal Dhar / Rajeev Chawla
 Smiley Suri as Renuka Ahuja
 Emraan Hashmi as Ali Bilal (extended cameo appearance)
 Deepal Shaw as Anita (Annie) Varma
 Atul Parchure as Bhaskar Rajput 
 Amrita Singh as Simi Roy
 Ashutosh Rana as Farid Ahmed aka Johnny (extended cameo appearance)
 Yatin Karyekar as Pushkaran Dhar
 Nisha Lalwani as Tanya Rampal
 Sheena Bajaj as Hema Birla
 Atif Aslam as Singer
 Billy Herrington as a bouncer
 Amitabh Bhattacharjee as Mumbai Police ACP Jadhav
 Prasad Oak as Anny's uncle
 Jazmin Chaudhry as Jazmin, a pornographic actress

Production
The film was initially titled 'Blue Film' however the title was later changed to 'Kali Yuga'. Sunny Leone was originally offered the lead role, but due to her demanding $10 million for the role, director Mohit Suri retreated.

Home media
Kalyug's VCDs and DVDs were released by Shemaroo six weeks after the theatrical release. The DVD Included Cast & Crew interviews, Television Promos of Kalyug, The Aadat Remix and Subtitles in four languages: English Tamil, Telugu and Bengali as Bonus Features.

Music

The soundtrack was released on 29 October 2005. Raju Singh composed the film score while the songs featured in the Soundtrack were composed by Anu Malik, Faisal Rafi, Rohail Hyatt, Jal, Goher Mumtaz and Mithoon. The track "Aadat" was reused from Jal's album of the same name, with music being recreated by Mithoon. According to the Indian trade website Box Office India, with around  units sold, this film's soundtrack album was the year's twelfth highest-selling.

Track listing

References

External links 
 

2005 films
2000s Hindi-language films
2005 action thriller films
Indian action thriller films
Indian films about revenge
Films about pornography
Films scored by Anu Malik
Films scored by Mithoon
Films directed by Mohit Suri